David Woods (6 April 1966 – 1 January 1996) was an Australian professional rugby league footballer who played in the 1980s and 1990s. He played for the Western Suburbs Magpies from 1988 to 1989, the Canberra Raiders 1990, 1992 and 1993, the Newcastle Knights in 1991 and finally the Gold Coast Chargers from 1994 to 1995.

Playing career
Woods made his first grade debut for Western Suburbs in 1988. Woods made 22 appearances in his debut year, but Western Suburbs finished last on the table claiming the wooden spoon.

In 1990, Woods joined Canberra and played 12 games in their premiership winning season but did not play in the grand final victory over Penrith Panthers.

In 1992, Woods joined Newcastle before returning to Canberra in 1993. In 1994, Woods joined the Gold Coast and spent 2 years with them as they struggled near the foot of the table. Woods was found dead in a car at Burleigh Heights, Queensland on New Year's Day, 1996. Police advised there were no suspicious circumstances to his death.

References

1966 births
1996 deaths
Australian rugby league players
Canberra Raiders players
Gold Coast Chargers players
Newcastle Knights players
Western Suburbs Magpies players
Rugby league players from Sydney
Rugby league props
Rugby league second-rows